The 2014–15 Vanderbilt Commodores women's basketball team represented Vanderbilt University in the 2014–15 college basketball season. The team's head coach was Melanie Balcomb, in her thirteenth season at Vanderbilt. The team plays their home games at Memorial Gymnasium in Nashville, Tennessee, as a member of the Southeastern Conference. They finished the season 15–16, 5–11 in SEC play to finish in a tie for eleventh place. They advanced to the second round of the SEC women's tournament where they lost to Kentucky.

Roster

Schedule

|-
!colspan=12 style="background:#000000; color:#BDAE79;"| Exhibition

|-
!colspan=12 style="background:#000000; color:#BDAE79;"| Non-conference regular season

|-
!colspan=12 style="background:#000000; color:#BDAE79;"| SEC regular season

|-
!colspan=12 style="background:#000000; color:#BDAE79;"| 2015 SEC Tournament

|-

Rankings

References

See also
2014–15 Vanderbilt Commodores men's basketball team

Vanderbilt
Vanderbilt Commodores women's basketball seasons